Aiguille Rouge is a mountain of Savoie, France. It lies in the Vanoise Massif and has an elevation of 3,227 metres above sea level. It is the highest point within the ski area of Les Arcs and is a fairly easy hike from the village below. It can also be accessed by a cable-car which almost reaches the summit area.

References

Alpine three-thousanders
Mountains of the Graian Alps
Mountains of Savoie